The classic Viennese ball has a tradition stretching back over four centuries, and has even taken the first steps towards inclusion in the UNESCO Intangible Cultural Heritage Lists. The full spectacle extends from the opening ceremony featuring a debutant's committee to midnight stage shows with dance and music performances.  There is also traditional ball etiquette involved – from the "Damenspenden", a gift presented to the ladies, to the requisite gown, tuxedo, or formal traditional Austrian dress, Austrian culture runs through every aspect of the Viennese ball.

Below is a list of balls in Vienna, capital of Austria.

External links
 Austria.com: The Ball Season
 Fodors.com: Things you need to know about Austria's ball season.
 AmazingAustria.com: Viennese Ball History
 VienneseBall.Org: Attire, Attending, Waltzing, Organizing, Music, Videos, Resources, Calendar of Viennese Balls in Europe and North America.

Vienna
Culture in Vienna
Vienna-related lists
Dance-related lists